Félix Aráuz (born 1935 in Guayaquil, Ecuador) is an Ecuadorian painter. Aráuz is among the art circles of Enrique Tábara, Aníbal Villacís, José Carreño and Juan Villafuerte.  In 1957,  Aráuz began studying under César Andrade Faini at the School of Fine Arts.  During his second year, his father died leaving Aráuz feeling nostalgic and isolated.  Aráuz funneled his emotions into his work creating some of the most beautiful, heartfelt and dreamlike imagery to date.  Both his use of color and his compositions are strong and designed to leave a lasting impression on the viewer.  Aráuz's subjects usually include surreal flower arrangements, the innocence of children, faces, 'trees of life', landscapes and abstracts - all of which are created with a personal dreamlike aesthetic.

In 1967, Aráuz married Nila Villafuerte Estrada, older sister of Juan Villafuerte.  Aráuz, Juan Villafuerte and José Carreño had a very close friendship forged at the School of Fine Arts. In the same year, Arauz received a government scholarship to travel to the United States with the fellow master painter Gilberto Almeida a member of the VAN group, an artist collective founded by Enrique Tábara and Aníbal Villacís and Jaime Villa in order to study galleries and museums throughout New York, Philadelphia, Washington, Chicago, San Francisco, Los Angeles and Miami.

In 1970, arranged through his friend, Jaime Andrade, Aráuz exhibited two paintings at the Pan American Union in Washington, D.C. and at Gallery Kromex in New York.  Both exhibits were considered notable.  In 1971, Aráuz obtained The Great Prize of Julio National Hall in Guayaquil.

In 1987, Aráuz traveled to Basel, Switzerland to exhibit with his friend Eloísa Melo.  From there, Aráuz traveled to Brussels and exhibited with Víctor Mideros.  Finally, Aráuz met up with longtime friend and colleague Jose Carreño in Paris.

Aráuz has been a professor at the School of Fine Arts since 1966 and continues to paint in his studio in Guayaquil, Ecuador.

Awards and medals

1965 & 1969 Second Prize, National Hall, October, Guayaquil, Ecuador        
 
1963 & 1972 First Prize, National Hall, October, Guayaquil, Ecuador

1968 Great prize, Gold Medal, National Hall, Guayaquil, Ecuador

1971 Great Prize, National Hall, Guayaquil, Ecuador

1975 Second Prize, National Hall, Guayaquil, Ecuador

1981 Gold Medal of Artistic Merit, granted by the illustrious Municipality of Guayaquil.

1996 Gold Brush Cultural Association.

References
 Municipalidad de Guayaquil - www.guayaquil.gov.ec/data/salondejulio/antecedentes.htm
 Salvat, Arte Contemporáneo de Ecuador. Salvat Editores Ecuatoriana, S.A., Quito, Ecuador, 1977.
 Arte Ecuatoriano, Salvat, Volume IV.

1935 births
Living people
Guayaquil
Ecuadorian painters
Modern painters
People from Guayaquil